Wildcat Canyon is a canyon and tributary stream of South Fork Pacheco Creek in Santa Clara County, California. Its source is in the Diablo Range in San Benito County, California.

References 

Rivers of San Benito County, California
Rivers of Santa Clara County, California
Tributaries of the Pajaro River
Diablo Range
Geography